Cathrine Marie Gielstrup née Morell (3 March 1755 – 29 October 1792) was a Danish stage actress. She was active at the Royal Danish Theatre in 1773–1792, and a member of the Det Dramatiske Selskab in 1777-79.

She was the daughter of the musician Lorentz Morell of the Royal Chapell orchestra. She is counted as among the elite of her profession at the time, famed for her soubrette roles, particularly within the plays of Holberg. She was praised for her ability to insert individuality and personality to even the most stereotypical roles.  She married the actor Adam Gottlob Gielstrup.

List of roles

Comediehuset
 1773	Crispin lakaj og doktor as Lise, tjenestepige
 1773	Den fortrolige moder as Lisette
 1773	Den gifte Filosof as Finette, Melites pige
 1773	Den honnette as Ambition	Pernille
 1773	Den sansesløse as Lisette
 1773	Det tredobbelte giftermaal as Pernille, Leonoras pige
 1773	Modens sæder as En pige
 1773	Mændenes skole as Lisette, Leonores pige
 1773	Sicilianeren as Climene, Adrastes søster / Musikant
 1774	Cavaleren efter moden as Lisette
 1774	Coquetten og den forstilte kyskhed as Marton, Cydalises kammerpige
 1774	De fortrædelige hændelser as Frosine
 1774	De pæne piger as Antoinette
 1774	De to gerrige as Lise, husjomfru hos Knapskær
 1774	Den alt for lønlige bejler as Pernille, Leonores kammerpige
 1774	Den listige enke as Marionette, kammerpige hos Rosaura
 1774	Den politiske kandestøber as Raadsherreinde
 1774	Den prøvede troskab as Signe
 1774	Den uformodentlige hjemkomst as Pernille
 1774	Den ærgerrige as Hyacinte, kammerpige hos Donna Beatrix
 1774	Det tvungne giftermaal as To Taterkoner
 1774	Menechmi as Finette, Aramintes kammerpige
 1774	Skotlænderinden as Polly, Lindanes kammerpige

Royal Danish Theatre
 1775	
 1775	Den kokette enke as Spinette
 1775	Henrik og Pernille as Pernille, Leonoras pige
 1776	Vennen af huset as Orfise, moder til Agathe
 1777	Aglae as Glycerie
 1777	Democritus as Cleanthis, Isemenes kammerpige
 1777	Den kærlige forbitrelse as Marine, Lucias kammerpige
 1777	Den straffede gjæk as Justine, fru Clorinvilles kammertjene* r
 1777	Det uventede møde as Balkis, opvarterske
 1777	Menechmi as Finette, Aramintes kammerpige
 1777	Sammensyeren as Lisette
 1778	Barselstuen as Første pige hos Corfitz / Stine Isenkræmmers
 1778	Coquetten og den forstilte kyskhed as Marton, Cydalises kammerpige
 1778	De aftakkede officerer as Lotte
 1778	Den forliebte autor og tjener as Lisette, kammerpige
 1778	Den forslidte kærlighed as Lisette
 1778	Den knurvorne doktor as Rosine
 1778	Den nye prøve as Lisette
 1778	Den politiske kandestøber as Anneke
 1778	Den uformodentlige forhindring as Pernille, Julies pige
 1778	Den uformodentlige hjemkomst as Pernille
 1778	Det aftvungne samtykke as Pernille
 1778	Det lykkelige skibbrud as Pernille, Jeronimus' pige
 1778	Det uventede møde as Balkis
 1778	Eugenie as Bethy, kammerpige hos Eugenie
 1778	Huset i oprør as Pernille, Leonores pige
 1778	Stifmoderen as Pernille, Leonores kammerpige
 1778	Ulysses von Ithacia as Elisa, kammerpige
 1779	Balders død as Valkyrie
 1779	Celinde as Lisette
 1779	De fortrædelige hændelser as Frosine
 1779	Den dobbelte prøve as Lisette
 1779	Den forlorne søn as Pernille, Leonores pige
 1779	Den gifte filosof as Finette, Melites pige
 1779	Den indbildt syge as Antoinette
 1779	Den kærlige forbitrelse as Marine, Lucias kammerpige
 1779	Den lykkelige fejltagelse as Antoinette
 1779	Den ærgerrige as Hyacinte, kammerpige hos Donna Beatrix
 1779	Faderen as Madam Papillon, kræmmerske
 1779	Hekseri as Pige
 1779	Huset i oprør as Pernille, Leonores pige
 1779	Jean de France aas Marthe, Jeronimus' pige
 1779	Maskeraden a Pernille
 1779	Melampe as Dorothea
 1779	Menechmi as Finette, Aramintes kammerpige
 1779	Minna af Barnhelm as Franciska, hendes pige
 1779	Uden hoved og hale as Kærling
 1780	Bondepigen ved hoffet as Ninette, bondepige
 1780	Den honnette ambition as Pernille
 1780	Den tavse pige as Ines, Donna Marcelas kammerpige
 1780	Den velbaarne frue as Fru klinge, en officers enke
 1780	Det gavmilde testament as Lisette
 1780	Det talende skilderi as Columbine, Isabelles kammerpige
 1780	Jacob von Tyboe as Pernille
 1780	Mændenes skole as Lisette, Leonores pige
 1780	Zemire og Azor as Fatme, Sanders datter
 1781	Arsene as Oraklet
 1781	Democritus as Cleanthis, Isemenes kammerpige
 1781	Den alt for nysgerrige bejler as Nerine, Julies pige
 1781	Greven af Walltron as Lisette, kammerpige
 1781	Kærlighed paa prøve as Pernille, Leonoras pige
 1781	Soliman den anden as Roxelane, en fransk slavinde
 1782	Cecilia as Lisette, Cecilias pige
 1782	Crispin lakaj og doktor as Lise, tjenestepige
 1782	De aftakkede officerer as Lotte
 1782	De nysgerrige fruentimmere as Lisette, Pige hos Olivia og Julie
 1782	Den nye prøve as Lisette
 1782	Don Juan as Karen
 1782	Eugenie as Bethy, kammerpige hos Eugenie
 1782	Henrik og Pernille as Pernille
 1782	Kærlighed uden strømper as Mette, Grethes fortrolige
 1782	Skovhuggeren as Berte
 1783	De to gerrige as Lise, husjomfru hos knapskær
 1783	Søofficererne	Mistress as Wellum, en modehandlerske
 1783	Væddeløbet as Marton
 1784	Aglae as Rodobe
 1784	Bagtalelsens skole as Lady Sneerwell
 1784	De uventede tilfælde as Marton, Grevindens pige
 1784	Den butte velgører as Marton, Gerontes husholderske
 1784	Ulysses von Ithacia as Elisa, kammerpige
 1784	Ægteskabsdjævelen as Bolette, kammerpige
 1785	Bagtalelsens skole as Lady Sneerwell
 1785	Barselstuen as Pige hos Corfitz /  Stine Isenkræmmers
 1785	De nysgerrige mandfolk as Fru Lisidor
 1785	Den Blinde klartseende as Pernille, Leonoras pige
 1785	Det foregivne hekseri as En ung zigeunerinde
 1786	Den løgnagtige as tjener	Lisette
 1786	Den nye prøve as Lisette
 1786	Det unge Menneske efter moden as Trine
 1787	Aglae as Glycerie
 1787	Bagtalelsens as skole	Lady Sneerwell
 1787	Barselstuen as Stine Isenkræmmers
 1787	Claudina af Villa Bella as Sibylla
 1787	Det foregivne hekseri as En ung zigeunerinde
 1787	Kvaternen as Madame Smidsk
 1788	Aglae as Glycerie
 1788	Bagtalelsens skole as Lady Sneerwell
 1788	Barselstuen as Stine Isenkræmmers
 1788	Bussemanden as Bolette
 1788	Cecilia as Lisette, Cecilias pige
 1788	De to gerrige as Lise, husjomfru hos knapskær
 1788	Forvandlingerne as Grethe, kælderpige
 1788	Hekseri as Pige
 1789	Bagtalelsens skole as Lady Sneerwell
 1789	Barselstuen as Pige hos Corfitz
 1789	De usynlige as Columbine, Harlekins fæstemø
 1790	Ariadne paa Naxos as Orkade
 1790	De nysgerrige fruentimmere as Lisette, Pige hos Olivia og Julie
 1790	Det talende skilderi as Columbine, Isabelles kammerpige
 1790	Steffen og Lise as Grethe, Jacobs kone
 1790	Ulysses von Ithacia as Elisa, kammerpige
 1791	Bagtalelsens skole as Lady Sneerwell
 1791	Barselstuen as Stine Isenkræ

References 
  Dansk Kvindebiografisk Leksikon

1755 births
1792 deaths
18th-century Danish actresses
Danish stage actresses